Reuss is a surname. Notable people with the surname include:
 Adolph Reuss (1804–1878), a German herpetologist
 Allan Reuss (1915–1988), a musician
 August Emanuel von Reuss (1811–1873), a Bohemian-Austrian geologist and paleontologist
 August Leopold von Reuss (1841–1924), Bohemian-Austrian ophthalmologist
 Edouard Guillaume Eugène Reuss (1804–1891), a theologian
 Heinrich XIII Prinz Reuss (born 1951), a German aristocrat accused of terrorism
 Henry S. Reuss (1912–2002), an American Congressman
 Isabel Reuss (born 1962), a Mexican freestyle swimmer
 Jerry Reuss (born 1949), an American baseball player
 Theodor Reuss (1855–1923), an occultist

See also
Reus (surname)
Ethnonymic surnames